St. Peter's Episcopal Church, now known as The New Saint James Holiness Church of Christ Disciples, is a historic Episcopal church in Norfolk, Virginia, United States. It is a frame, gable-roofed building with two contiguous sections: 1) the sanctuary built in 1886; 2) and the fellowship hall (originally called the "parish house") built in 1912.  The church building is in the Gothic Revival style.  The building features a small gable-roofed arched entrance door and large and small arched stained-glass windows. St.
Peter's is one of six mission churches that descended from St. Paul's.  St. Peter's Episcopal Church operated at this location until 1959, when it was transferred to the African-American trustees of Garretts Independent Community Church.  In 1967, St. Peter's was transferred to the trustees of what come to be known as Saint James Holiness Church of Christ Disciples.

It was listed on the National Register of Historic Places in 2010.

References

19th-century Episcopal church buildings
Carpenter Gothic church buildings in Virginia
Churches completed in 1886
Churches in Norfolk, Virginia
Episcopal churches in Virginia
National Register of Historic Places in Norfolk, Virginia
Churches on the National Register of Historic Places in Virginia